The 2013 Asian Cycling Championships took place at the Indira Gandhi Stadium Velodrome in New Delhi, India from 7 to 17 March 2013.

Medal summary

Road

Men

Women

Track

Men

Women

Medal table

References

External links
 Asian Cycling Federation

Asia
Asia
Asian Cycling Championships
Asian Cycling Championships
International cycle races hosted by India
Cycling Championships